The Serbian First  League is the second-highest football league in Serbia. The league is operated by the Serbian FA. Sixteen teams competed in this league for the 2013–14 season. Two teams were promoted to the Serbian Superliga while the 3rd placed team played in the play-offs against the 14th team in the Super liga for the first time. Four teams were relegated to the Serbian League, the third-highest division overall in the Serbian football league system. The season began in August 2013 and ended in June 2014.

2013–14 teams

Hajduk Kula liquidation

In July Serbian SuperLiga club Hajduk Kula went defunct thus leaving an empty place in 2013–14 Serbian SuperLiga. On an urgent meeting in Football Association of Serbia, it was ruled that 3rd placed team from 2012–13 Serbian First League should be promoted to Serbian SuperLiga. It was also announced that, due to shortage of time until the beginning of the season, 13th placed team from last season is going to stay in the league for the current season. Formally, that meant that Voždovac was promoted and Teleoptik stayed in the league.

League table

Results

Top goalscorers
Source: Prva liga official website

* Club name in italic indicates player's former club.

Hat-tricks

References

External links
 Official website

Serbian First League seasons
2013–14 in Serbian football leagues
Serbia